The GSI L'Equipe Open was a golf tournament on the European Tour in 1985. It was held at Le Touquet Golf Club in Le Touquet, France, and was won by England's Mark James.

Winners

External links
Coverage on the European Tour's official site

Former European Tour events
Defunct golf tournaments in France
Le Touquet